Ljubomir "Ljuba" Katić (born 25 April 1934) is a Serbian former basketball player and coach. He represented the Yugoslavia national basketball team internationally.

Playing career 
Katić started his basketball career with Partizan Zrenjanin. Later, he moved to another Zrenjanin-based team Radnički Kristal. 

In autumn 1952, Katić joined Proleter Zrenjanin. On 22 May 1953, he made his professional debut for Proleter in a 54–52 loss to Crvena zvezda. During his first stint with Proleter he won the Yugoslav Championship in the 1956 season. Katić was a part of the group of players known as the Proleter's Five, which included himself, Milutin Minja, Lajos Engler, Dušan Radojčić, and Vilmos Lóczi.

During the 1958 season, Katić played for Crvena zvezda from Belgrade. He moved to the Zvezda together with Minja. After one season in Belgrade, he moved back to Zrenjanin. During his second stint with Proleter, he was a player-coach together with Lóczi. Katić played for Proleter until 1964 when he moved to Split, SR Croatia, with his family. There he joined Split, a team coached by Branko Radović, his teammate in the Zvezda. On 26 April 1964, Katić he made his debut for Split in a 65–63 loss to Partizan. Split debuted in the Yugoslav First Federal League in that season.

National team career
Katić was a member of the Yugoslavia national team that participated at the 1955 European Championships in Budapest, Hungary. Over five tournament games, he averaged 2.0 points per game. Also, he was a member of the national team that participated at the 1957 European Championships in Sofia, Bulgaria. Over nine tournament games, he averaged 4.4 points per game.

Katić played 29 games for the national team and averaged 3.4 points per game.

Coaching career 
Katić started his coaching career during the second playing stint with Proleter Zrenjanin when he was a player-coach. After retirement from playing career, he was just a coach. In 1975, Katić became the head coach for Čelik Zenica. Four years later, he left Čelik.

Career achievements and awards 
 Yugoslav League champion: 1 (with Proleter Zrenjanin: 1956).
 Plaque of the Basketball Federation of Serbia (2016)

In popular culture 
 The 2016 Serbian documentary, Šampioni iz pedeset i šeste, portrays Katić and the achievements of the Proleter basketball team in the mid 1950s and how they won the Yugoslav Championship in 1956.

References

1934 births
Living people
Centers (basketball)
KK Crvena zvezda players
KK Proleter Zrenjanin coaches
KK Proleter Zrenjanin players
KK Split players
Power forwards (basketball)
Serbian expatriate basketball people in Bosnia and Herzegovina
Serbian expatriate basketball people in Croatia
Serbian men's basketball coaches
Serbian men's basketball players
Sportspeople from Zrenjanin
Yugoslav basketball coaches
Yugoslav men's basketball players